Abd al-Qadir or Abdulkadir is a male Muslim given name. It is formed from the Arabic words Abd, al- and Qadir. The name means "servant of who can everything", Al=The. Al-Qādir being one of the names of Allah in the Qur'an, which give rise to the Muslim theophoric names.

The letter a of the al- is unstressed, and can be transliterated by almost any vowel, often by u. So the first part can appear as Abdel, Abdul or Abdal. The second part can be transliterated Qader, Kadir, Qadir, Kader, Gadir or in other ways, and the whole name subject to variable spacing and hyphenation.

There is a related but much less common name, Abdul Qadeer, with a similar meaning. The two may become confused when transliterated, and a few of the names below may be instances of the latter name.

Notable people with the name include:

Men

In sport

Athletics 
 Abdelkader Zaddem (born 1944), Tunisian runner
 Abdelkader El Mouaziz (born 1969), Moroccan runner
 Abdelkader Hachlaf (born 1979), Moroccan runner
 Abdalla Abdelgadir (born 1988), Sudanese runner

Cricket 
 Abdul Kadir (cricketer) (1944–2002), Pakistani cricketer
 Abdul Qadir (cricketer) (1955–2019), Pakistani cricketer
 Abdul Kadeer Ali (born 1983), English cricketer
 Abdul Cader (cricketer) (born 1995), Sri Lankan cricketer

Football 
 Abdelkader Ben Bouali (1912–1997) French footballer
 Abdul Kadir (Indonesian footballer) (1948–2003), Indonesian footballer
 Abdulqadir Hassan (born 1962), Emirati footballer
 Abdelkader El Brazi (born 1964), Moroccan footballer
 Abdelkader Ferhaoui (born 1965), Algerian footballer
 Azizon Abdul Kadir (born 1980), Malaysian footballer
 Abdul Kader Keïta (born 1981), Ivorian footballer
 Abdelkader Laïfaoui (born 1981), Algerian footballer
 Abdoul Kader Camara (born 1982), Guinean footballer
 Abdelkader Besseghir (born 1978), Algerian footballer
 Mohamed Abdel-Kader Coubadja-Touré, otherwise Mohamed Kader (born 1979), Togolese footballer
 Abdou Kader Mangane (born 1983), Senegalese footballer
 Abdelkader Ghezzal (born 1984), French-Algerian footballer
 Abdulkader Dakka (born 1985), Syrian footballer
 Abdulkadir Özgen (born 1986), Turkish-German footballer
 Abdelkader Kraichi (born 1989), French footballer
 Abdel Kader Rifai (born 1973), Syrian footballer
 Abdülkadir Kayalı (born 1991), Turkish footballer
 Anwar Abdalqader, Syrian football manager
 Abdelkader Freha, Algerian footballer

Martial arts 
 Syed Abdul Kadir (born 1948), Singapore boxer
 Abdülkadir Koçak (born 1981), Turkish boxer
 Abdelkader Zrouri (born 1976), Moroccan Taekwondo athlete
 Abdelkader Bouhenia (born 1986), French boxer
 Abdulqader Hikmat (born 1987), Qatari Taekwondo practitioner
 Abdelkader Chadi (born 1988), Algerian boxer

Other sports 
 Omer Abdelqader (born 1983), Qatari basketball player
 Hisham Abdulqader Abdulla (born 1976), Bahraini volleyball player
 Abdel Kader Sylla (born 1990), Seychelles basketball player
 Justin Abdelkader (born 1987), American ice-hockey player

In the arts 
 Abd al-Qadir Maraghi (middle of 14th century – 1435), Persian poet, musician and artist
 Abd al-Qadir al-Fasi (1599–1680), Moroccan writer
 Abdul Qader Al Raes (born 1951), UAE artist
 Abdulkadir Ahmed Said (born 1953), Somali film director, producer, screenwriter, cinematographer and editor
 Abd El Gadir Salim (born ca. 1955), Sudanese folk-singer
 Abdelkader Benali (born 1975), Moroccan-Dutch writer and journalist
 Abdul-Qādir Bēdil (1642–1720), Indian-Persian poet and Sufi
 Abdullah bin Abdul Kadir (1796–1854), Malayan writer
 Abdul Qadir Al Rassam (1882–1952), Iraqi painter
 Ibrahim Abdel-Kader el-Mazni (1890–1949), Egyptian novelist, short story writer, essayist, translator, and poet
 Abdul Quadir (1906–1984), Bangladeshi poet
 `Abd al-Qadir Bada'uni (1540 – c. 1615), Indo-Persian historian and translator
 Kozhikode Abdul Kader (1916–1977), Indian playback singer
 Abdelkader Alloula (1929–1994), Algerian playwright

Politicians and secular leaders

From Africa 
 Abd al-Qadir II (fl. 1603/4–1606), ruler of the Kingdom of Sennar (Sudan)
 Emir Abdelkader al-Jazairi (1808–1883), Algerian religious and military leader
 Abd al-Qadir (Sokoto) (fl. 1842–1859), Sokoto (Nigeria) Grand Vizier
 Abdul Qadir al-Badri (1921–2003), Libyan politician
 Abdulkadir Balarabe Musa (born 1936), Nigerian politician
 Abdelkader Bengrina (born 1962), Algerian politician
 Abdulkadir Abdi Hashi, Somali politician
 Abdoulkader Cissé (born 1955), Burkinabe politician
 Abdelkader Hachani (1956–1999), Algerian Islamist politician
 Abdulqadir al-Baghdadi (died 2011), Libyan diplomat
 Abdelkader Taleb Omar, Sahrawi politician
 Abdelkader Lecheheb, Moroccan diplomat
 Abdulkadir Kure, Nigerian politician
 Abdulkadir Isse Ahmed Salah, Somali sultan
 Inuwa Abdulkadir (1966–2020), Nigerian politician
 Mohamed Abdoulkader Mohamed (born 1951), Djiboutian politician
 Wadel Abdelkader Kamougué (born 1939), Chadian politician

From the Middle East 
 Abdul Qader al-Keilani (1874–1948), Syrian nationalist, statesman and religious authority
 Faisal Abdel Qader Al-Husseini, otherwise Faisal Husseini (1940–2001), Palestinian politician
 Abdülkadir Aksu (born 1944), Turkish politician
 Abdul Qadir Bajamal (born 1946), Yemeni politician
 Abd al-Qadir Qaddura, Syrian politician
 Abdul Qadir Obeidi, Iraqi politician

From Southeast Asia and the Subcontinent 
 Zambry Abdul Kadir (born 1962), Malaysian politician
 Abdul Kadir Yusuf (1915–1992), Malaysian politician
 Abdul Aziz Abdul Kadir, Malaysian politician
 Abdul Cader Shahul Hameed (1928–1999), Sri Lankan diplomat and political figure
 A.R.M. Abdul Cader (born 1936), Sri Lankan politician and businessman
 Abdul Kader Mia (died 1960), Bengali politician
 Abdul Qadir Alam, Afghan politician
 Abdul Qadir Baloch, Pakistani politician and retired military general
 Abdul Qadir Imami Ghori (born 1954), Afghan politician
 Abdul Qadir (Muslim leader) (1872–1950), leader of Muslims during the British Raj
 Abdul Qadir Patel (born 1968), Pakistani politician
 Abdul Qadir Nuristani, Afghan policeman and Minister of Interior during the Republic of Afghanistan

From elsewhere 
 Abdul Kadir (politician) (ca. 1952–2018), Guyanese politician and conspirator in a planned attack of JFK Airport

In religion 
 Abdul-Qadir Gilani (1077–1166), Persian Sufi saint
 Abd al-Qadir ibn Shaqrun (died 1801 or 1804), Moroccan religious scholar
 Abdelkader El Djezairi (1808–1883), commonly known as Emir Abdelkader, Algerian Sufi saint and military leader
 Abdul Qader Arnaoot (1928–2004), Albanian-Syrian Islamic scholar
 Abdalqadir as-Sufi (1930–2021), Scottish Sufi
 Sheikh Syed Abdul Qadir Jilani (born 1935), Pakistani Sunni scholar and jurist
 Abdul Qadir Ebrahimji founder of Atba-i-Malak Vakil
 Abdolqader Zahedi, Kurdish-Iranian Sunni religious teacher and politician

Military figures and activists 
 Abdelkader Perez (fl. 1723–1737), Moroccan Admiral and ambassador to England
 Abd al-Qadir al-Husayni (1907–1948), Palestinian Arab nationalist and fighter
 Abdulkadir Yahya Ali, Somali peace activist
 Abdelkader Guerroudj (fl. 1957), Algerian communist active in the liberation war
 Abdul Qadir (1944–2014), Afghan military officer during the Saur Revolution and Minister of Defense during the Democratic Republic of Afghanistan (DRA)
 Abdul Qadir (Afghan leader) (ca. 1951–2002), military leader of the Northern Alliance in Afghanistan
 Abdelkader Belliraj (born 1957), Moroccan-Belgian found guilty of terrorist offences
 Abdelkader Mokhtari, Algerian commander active in the Bosnian war
 Abdulkadir Shehu, Nigerian military/politician

Detainees 
 Abd Al Nasir Mohammed Abd Al Qadir Khantumani (born 1960), Syrian held in Guantanamo
 Moez Bin Abdul Qadir Fezzani (Bagram detainee), Tunisian
 Mohammed Abd Al Al Qadir (impossible name) (born 1976), Algerian held in Guantanamo
 Abdullah Abdulqadirakhun (born 1979), Uyghur held in Guantanamo
 Idris Ahmed Abdu Qader Idris (born 1979), Yemeni held in Guantanamo
 Ahmed Abdul Qader (born 1984), Yemeni held in Guantanamo

Other 
 Abdul Qadeer Khan (born 1936), Pakistani nuclear scientist
 Abdulkadir Ahmed (born 1940), Nigerian banker
 Abdul Qadir (banker), Pakistani banker
 Abdul Kader Kamli, Arab IT expert
 Mustafa Abdulkader Aabed al-Ansari, otherwise Mustafa al-Ansari, Saudi wanted by the FBI
 Abdi Wali Abdulqadir Muse, probable correct name of Abduwali Abdukhadir Muse (born ca. 1992), Somali imprisoned for piracy

Women 
 Zainab Abdulkadir Kure (born 1959), Nigerian politician

References 

Arabic masculine given names
Iranian masculine given names
Turkish masculine given names